Prehistoric Wales in terms of human settlements covers the period from about 230,000 years ago, the date attributed to the earliest human remains found in what is now Wales, to the year AD 48 when the Roman army began a military campaign against one of the Welsh tribes. Traditionally, historians have believed that successive waves of immigrants brought different cultures into the area, largely replacing the previous inhabitants, with the last wave of immigrants being the Celts. However, studies of population genetics now suggest that this may not be true, and that immigration was on a smaller scale.

Palaeolithic

The earliest known human remains discovered in modern-day Wales date from 230,000 years ago. An early Neanderthal upper jaw fragment containing two teeth, whose owner probably lived during an interglacial period in the Lower Palaeolithic, was found in a cave in the River Elwy valley, at the Bontnewydd Palaeolithic site, near St Asaph, Denbighshire. Excavations of the site between 1978 and 1995 revealed a further 17 teeth belonging to five individuals, a total of seven hand axes and some animal bones, some of which show signs of butchery. This site is the most north-westerly in Eurasia at which the remains of early hominids have been found, and is considered to be of international importance. Late Neanderthal hand axes were also found at Coygan Cave, Carmarthenshire and have been dated to between 60,000 and 35,000 years old.

The Paviland limestone caves of the Gower Peninsula in south Wales are by far the richest source of Aurignacian material in Britain, including burins and scrapers dated to about 28,500 years ago. The first remains of modern humans, Homo sapiens sapiens, to be found in Wales was the famous Red Lady of Paviland, discovered in the 1820s. This was a human skeleton dyed in red ochre discovered in 1823 in one of the Paviland caves in Gower. Despite the name, the skeleton is actually that of a young man who lived about 29,000 years ago, coincident with a warmer period  at the end of the Upper Paleolithic Period (Old Stone Age). He is considered to be the oldest known ceremonial burial in Western Europe. The skeleton was found along with fragments of small cylindrical ivory rods, fragments of ivory bracelets and seashells. Settlement in Wales was apparently intermittent, as periods of cooling and warming led to the ice sheets advancing and retreating. Wales appears to have been abandoned from about 21,000 years ago until after 13,000 years ago, with a burial found at Kendrick's Cave on the Great Orme dating to about 12,000 years ago.

Mesolithic
Following the last Ice age, Wales became roughly the shape it is today by about 7000 BC and was inhabited by Mesolithic hunter-gatherers. Wales has many sites where Mesolithic material has been found, but securely stratified material is rare. The earliest dated Mesolithic site in Wales is Nab Head, Pembrokeshire, around 9,200 years ago. Many of the sites from this period are coastal, although 9,000 years ago they would have been some distance inland from the sea. There is a particular concentration in Pembrokeshire, but there are also a good number of upland sites, most apparently seasonal hunting locations, for example around Llyn Brenig. Some decorated pebbles found at Rhuddlan represent the earliest art found in Wales.

An investigation of post holes at the late Neolithic - Early Bronze Age chambered tomb of Bryn Celli Ddu on Anglesey, published in 2006, gave a radiocarbon dating which placed two of the holes in the Mesolithic period.

Neolithic

The earliest farming communities are now believed to date from about 4000 BC, marking the beginning of the Neolithic period. Pollen evidence indicates the clearing of forests on an increasing scale during this period. The Neolithic saw the construction of many chambered tombs, the most notable including Bryn Celli Ddu and Barclodiad y Gawres on Anglesey. Three main types of megalithic tomb are found in Wales, the Severn-Cotswold type in the south-east, the Portal dolmen type and the Passage graves which are characteristic of the Irish Sea area and the Atlantic façade of Europe and Morocco. Megalithic tombs are most common in the western lowlands. There is evidence of close cultural links with Ireland, particularly in the Early Neolithic period.

A number of houses from the Neolithic period have also been found in Wales, most notably the settlement at Clegyr Boia near St David's in Pembrokeshire. Many artefacts have also been found, particularly polished stone axeheads. There were a number of "factories" in Wales producing these axeheads, the largest being the Graig Lwyd factory at Penmaenmawr on the north coast which exported its products as far afield as Yorkshire and the English midlands. Pottery finds also indicate a relationship with Ireland.

The Bronze Age

Metal tools first appeared in Wales about 2500 BC, initially copper followed by bronze. The climate during the Early Bronze Age (c. 2100-1400 BC) is thought to have been warmer than at present, as there are many remains from this period in what are now bleak uplands. Much of the copper for the production of bronze probably came from the copper mine on the Great Orme, where prehistoric mining on a very large scale dates largely from the middle Bronze Age. In particular copper from the Great Orme mines appears to have been used for the production of bronze implements of the Acton Park Complex, named after a hoard found at Acton Park near Wrexham. These tools, particularly axeheads, were developed towards the end of the Early Bronze Age and are innovative in both metallurgy and design. They were widely exported, with examples being found along the continental coast from Brittany to north Germany. 

Burial practices in the Bronze Age differed from the communal tombs of the Neolithic period, with a change to burial in round barrows and the provision of grave goods. Inhumation was soon replaced by cremation and in Wales the cemetery mound with a number of burials had become the standard form by about 2000 BC.  One of the most striking finds from Bronze Age Wales was the gold cape found in a tomb at Bryn yr Ellyllion, Mold, Flintshire dated to 1900-1600 BC, weighing 560 g and produced from a single gold ingot. Very few weapons have been found in Early Bronze Age graves in Wales compared with other objects, and the lack of traces of earlier Bronze Age settlements is thought to indicate that farms or hamlets were undefended.

From about 1250 BC there was a deterioration in the climate which became more marked from about 1000 BC, with higher rainfall and much lower summer temperatures. This led to an increase in peat formation and probably the abandonment of many upland settlements. It has been suggested that this led to conflict and to changes in social organization, with the earliest hillforts appearing about 800 BC.

The Late Bronze Age saw the development of more advanced bronze implements, with weapons becoming increasingly common. While the weapons reflect introduced styles, there are pronounced regional variations in the styles of tools, particularly axes. On the basis of tool types, Wales can be divided into four regions, the south-east, south-west, north-west and north-east. These regions show an approximate correspondence to the territories of the tribes later recorded in these areas by the Romans, the Silures, Demetae, Ordovices and Deceangli respectively.

The Iron Age

The earliest iron implements found in Wales come from Llyn Fawr at the head of the Rhondda Valley, where objects apparently deposited as votive offerings include three made of iron: a sword, a spearhead and a sickle. These items are thought to date to about 650 BC, and while the sword appears to be imported, the sickle is an imitation of a native bronze prototype.  The Iron Age saw the building of hillforts which are particularly numerous in Wales, including Pen Dinas near Aberystwyth and Tre'r Ceiri on the Llŷn Peninsula. The earliest distinctively Iron Age settlement in Wales is considered to be Castell Odo, a small hillfort near the tip of the Llŷn Peninsula, dated to about 400 BC. The largest hillforts are most numerous along the eastern border of Wales, with some large examples also found in the lowlands of north-west Wales. In the south-west, by contrast, hillforts are very numerous but mainly small, with an area of under 1.2 hectares.

A particularly significant find from this period was made in 1943 at Llyn Cerrig Bach on Anglesey, when the ground was being prepared for the construction of a Royal Air Force base. The cache included weapons, shields, chariots along with their fittings and harnesses, and slave chains and tools. Many had been deliberately broken and seem to have been votive offerings. These finds are considered to be one of the most important collections of La Tène metalwork discovered in Britain. Pottery on the other hand is fairly rare in Wales during this period and most of what has been found appears to be imported.

The La Tène culture is traditionally associated with the Celts, and the general view until fairly recently was that the appearance of this culture indicated a large-scale invasion by peoples who also brought a Celtic language which later developed into Welsh. The currently more popular view is that any movement of peoples was on a smaller scale, with cultural diffusion responsible for most of the changes. There is some evidence to support the latter model, such as burials associated with earlier religious sites. It has been suggested that a Celtic language was being spoken in Wales by about 700 BC.

The prehistoric period ended with the arrival of the Roman army, who began their campaigns against the Welsh tribes in 48 AD with an attack on the Deceangli in north-east Wales. Wales was divided between a number of tribes, of which the Silures and the Ordovices put up the most stubborn resistance. The Roman conquest of Wales was complete by 79 AD. The reports of Roman historians such as Tacitus give a little more information about Wales in this period, such as that the island of Anglesey was apparently a stronghold of the Druids. The impact of the arrival of the Romans may have varied from one part of Wales to another; for example there is evidence that some hillforts, such as Tre'r Ceiri, continued to be occupied during the Roman period.

Notes

See also
List of Cadw properties
Archaeology of Wales
Early history of Ireland
Prehistoric Britain
Prehistoric Scotland

References 
 Barry Cunliffe (1987) Iron Age communities in Britain''' (Routledge & Kegan Paul, 2nd ed) 
 John Davies, (1994) A History of Wales (Penguin Books) 
 I.Ll. Foster & Glyn Daniel (eds) (1965) Prehistoric and early Wales (Routledge and Kegan Paul)
 John Edward Lloyd (1911) A history of Wales: from the earliest times to the Edwardian conquest (Longmans, Green & Co.)
 Frances Lynch (1995) Gwynedd (A guide to ancient and historic Wales series) (HMSO) 
 Frances Lynch (1970) Prehistoric Anglesey: the archaeology of the island to the Roman conquest (Anglesey Antiquarian Society)
 Frances Lynch, Stephen Aldhouse-Green and Jeffrey L. Davies (2000) Prehistoric Wales (Sutton Publishing) 
 Pitts, M. 2006. Sensational new discoveries at Bryn Celli Ddu. British Archaeology No. 89 (July/August) p. 6
 J.A. Taylor (ed) (1980) Culture and environment in prehistoric Wales'' (BAR British series 76)

External links

Royal Commission on the Ancient and Historical Monuments of Wales
Artifacts from Pontnewydd Cave held on Gathering the Jewels
Artifacts from Coygan Cave held on Gathering the Jewels
Artifacts from Paviland Cave held on Gathering the Jewels
Mesolithic stone beads from Nabs Head, Pembrokeshire, held on Gathering the Jewels
Mesolithic fins from Rhuddlan held on Gathering the Jewels
Pentre Ifan Cromlech/Dolmen in Pembrokeshire, Wales
Carreg Coetan Arthur Cromlech/Dolmen in Pembrokeshire, Wales
The Prehistoric Monuments in Wales, Herbert E. Roese

 
 Prehistoric Wales
 Prehistoric Wales
 Prehistoric Wales
Wales